Château d'Enghien may refer to:

 Château d'Enghien (Chantilly) on the grounds of the Château de Chantilly, Oise, France
 Château d'Enghien (Belgium) in Enghien, Wallonia, Belgium.